Stomatella impertusa, common name the strigose stomatella or the elongate false ear shell, is a species of sea snail, a marine gastropod mollusk in the family Trochidae, the top snails.

Description
The length of the shell varies between 5 mm and 25 mm. The small, thin shell has a lengthened oval shape. It is shining, yellowish-green, ornamented with white triangular spots with dark apices, sometimes in series. The shell is decussated by incremental and deeper spiral striae. The shell contains three whorls and a nearly terminal apex. The narrow aperture is oval, its ventral face nearly level. Inside it is shining and greenish. The shell is very delicate and slender, allied to Stomatella planulata, a much larger species, and Stomatella auricula,

Distribution
This marine species occurs in the Southwest Pacific, off East India, the Philippines, Australia, Japan, in the Red Sea and as a casual find in the Mediterranean Sea.

References

 Adams, A. 1850. An arrangement of Stomatellidae, including the characters of a new genus Cumingia, with some additional generic characters. Proceedings of the Zoological Society of London 1850(18): 29–40, pl. 8
 Hedley, C. 1917. Studies on Australian Mollusca. Part XIII. Proceedings of the Linnean Society of New South Wales 41: 680–719
 Iredale, T. 1924. Results from Roy Bell's molluscan collections. Proceedings of the Linnean Society of New South Wales 49(3): 179–279, pl. 33-36
 Allan, J.K. 1950. Australian Shells: with related animals living in the sea, in freshwater and on the land. Melbourne : Georgian House xix, 470 pp., 45 pls, 112 text figs.
 Iredale, T. & McMichael, D.F. 1962. A reference list of the marine Mollusca of New South Wales. Memoirs of the Australian Museum 11: 1–109
 Macpherson, J.H. & Gabriel, C.J. 1962. Marine Molluscs of Victoria. Melbourne : Melbourne University Press & National Museum of Victoria 475 pp
 Macpherson, J.H. 1966. Port Philip Survey 1957–1963. Memoirs of the National Museum of Victoria, Melbourne 27: 201–288
 Coleman, N. 1975. What shell is that? Sydney : Lansdowne Press 298 pp
 Phillips, D.A.B., Handreck, C., Bock, P.E., Burn, R., Smith, B.J. & Staples, D.A. (eds) 1984. Coastal Invertebrates of Victoria: an atlas of selected species. Melbourne : Marine Research Group of Victoria & Museum of Victoria 168 pp.
 Wilson, B. 1993. Australian Marine Shells. Prosobranch Gastropods. Kallaroo, Western Australia : Odyssey Publishing Vol. 1 408 pp. 
 Higo, S., Callomon, P. & Goto, Y. 1999. Catalogue and Bibliography of the Marine Shell-bearing Mollusca of Japan. Japan : Elle Scientific Publications 749 pp
 Zenetos A., Gofas S., Russo G. & Templado J., 2004: CIESM Atlas of exotic species in the Mediterranean. 3. Molluscs (F. Briand, ed.) CIESM Publishers, Monaco 376 p. 
 Streftaris, N.; Zenetos, A.; Papathanassiou, E. (2005). Globalisation in marine ecosystems: the story of non-indigenous marine species across European seas. Oceanogr. Mar. Biol. Annu. Rev. 43: 419–453

External links
 

impertusa
Gastropods described in 1815